Thomas Edgar Rothman (born November 21, 1954) is an American film executive and current chairman and CEO of Sony Pictures Motion Picture Group. In this role, Rothman oversees all of the studio's motion picture production and distribution activities worldwide, including Columbia Pictures, TriStar Pictures, Screen Gems, Sony Pictures Imageworks, Sony Pictures Animation, Sony Pictures Classics, 3000 Pictures, Sony Pictures International Productions, Stage 6 Films, AFFIRM Films. Rothman joined Sony Pictures in late-2013 as chairman of TriStar Productions and in 2015 was promoted to Chairman of Sony Pictures Motion Picture Group, followed by the release in 2017 and 2018 of titles such as Jumanji: Welcome to the Jungle, Venom, Hotel Transylvania 3: Summer Vacation, Peter Rabbit, and Spider-Man: Into the Spider-Verse. Under Rothman's leadership, the Motion Picture Group was returned to strong profitability and experienced several of its most profitable years in history with Once Upon a Time in Hollywood and Little Women. Driven by tentpoles such as Spider-Man: Far From Home, Jumanji: The Next Level, and Bad Boys For Life, fiscal year 2020 (April 2019 through March 2020) was the film studio's best in over a decade in terms of both ultimate profitability and operating income.

Previously, he was chairman and chief executive officer of Fox Filmed Entertainment with Jim Gianopulos until his resignation on September 14, 2012, effective January 1, 2013. Rothman began at Fox in 1994 as the founder and President of Fox Searchlight Pictures and served the company for 18 years. During Rothman's tenure, Fox films were nominated for over 150 Oscars and won three Best Picture Awards. The company also earned over $30 billion in the box office and made the then two  highest-grossing films, Titanic and Avatar. Rothman also hosted Fox Legacy, a television series in which he provided background and behind-the-scenes information regarding the making of films.

Early life and education
Rothman was born in to a Jewish family in Baltimore, Maryland. In 1972, he graduated from the Park School of Baltimore prior to entering college. Rothman graduated from Brown University with Honors in English and American Literature, magna cum laude, Phi Beta Kappa, and was an All New England selection in Division 1 Lacrosse.

In 1977, he worked as an English Teacher at the Salisbury School in Connecticut and coached varsity soccer. He graduated from Columbia Law School in 1980 as a James Kent Scholar, the school's highest academic honor. In 1981, he served on The United States Court of Appeals Second Circuit as a law clerk for the Honorable Walter Mansfield. From 1982 to 1986, he worked as an attorney at Frankfurt Kurnit Klein & Selz.

Film career
In 1986, Rothman co-produced Jim Jarmusch's Down by Law and Robert Frank's Candy Mountain. In 1987, he began working as an executive vice president of Columbia Pictures on all aspects of film development and production. In 1989, he served as president of Worldwide Production for the Samuel Goldwyn Company. He supervised landmark independent films such as Henry V, Much Ado About Nothing, Longtime Companion, Truly Madly Deeply, Wild At Heart, and The Madness of King George. He discovered and championed numerous young filmmakers who went on to become successful, including Ang Lee, Anthony Minghella, and Kenneth Branagh. During this time, the company's films won the Palme d'Or at Cannes three times.

For 18 years, Rothman worked at Fox Filmed Entertainment. In 1994, he founded and was the first president of Searchlight Pictures, one of the first specialty film divisions linked to a major studio. Fox Searchlight went on to distribute multiple Oscar-winning films, including Slumdog Millionaire, which won the Best Picture Oscar in 2008. Rothman was president of production for Twentieth Century Fox where he oversaw the majority of the company's film development and production from 1996 to 1998 and was president of Twentieth Century Fox Film Group from 1998 to 2000. From 2000 to 2012, he was chairman and CEO of Fox Filmed Entertainment (FFE). FFE included 20th Century Fox, Fox Searchlight Pictures, Blue Sky Animation, and Twentieth Century Fox Television. During this time, the studio was nominated for over 150 Academy Awards, won three Best Picture Oscars, earned over $30 billion in worldwide box office sales. Fox had the best profit margins of any film studio. Some of the films produced over Rothman's tenure include: Lincoln, Life of Pi, The Descendants, Cast Away, Master and Commander: The Far Side of the World, Black Swan, Walk the Line, Juno, The Devil Wears Prada, The X-Men series, the Ice Age series, Rio, and several others. Under Rothman's leadership, Fox produced Modern Family, Glee, and Homeland. From 2007 to 2010, Tom Rothman hosted Fox Legacy, a television series in which he provided background and behind-the-scenes information regarding the making of films. As Fox chairman, he became known for rejecting the idea behind Deadpool, claiming it wouldn't be successful, and making the decision to have the character (whose nickname is "The Merc With a Mouth") have his mouth sewn shut for the majority of his first film appearance in X-Men Origins: Wolverine. In September 2012, Tom Rothman resigned as chairman and chief executive of Fox Filmed Entertainment. That same month, Steven Spielberg announced that Rothman would produce Spielberg's Robopocalypse, for DreamWorks.

In 2013, Sundance Film Festival named Rothman to its U.S. Dramatic Jury, and he presented the Grand Jury prize to Fruitvale Station. Initially responsible for the re-launch of the Tristar Productions studio, it was announced in February 2015 that Rothman would replace Amy Pascal as chairman of Sony Pictures' Motion Picture Group and would continue to oversee the properties he greenlit at TriStar. In September 2018, Sony Pictures extended their contract with Rothman following the release of Spider-Man: Far From Home.

Awards and recognition

In 1995, the first Fox Searchlight movie The Brothers McMullen won The Grand Jury Prize at the Sundance Film Festival.
In 1997, Titanic was nominated for a record 14 Academy Awards and won Best Picture and 10 other Academy Awards.
In 1998, Columbia University awarded Rothman the Arthur B. Krim Award for outstanding leadership in his work.
In 2003, Premiere's Power List ranked Tom Rothman #7.
In 2004, The Saturn Rings, an award presented annually by The Academy of Science Fiction, Fantasy & Horror Films, awarded Tom Rothman The Life Career Award.
In 2004, The National Multiple Sclerosis Society honored Tom Rothman at its 30th Annual Dinner of Champions.
In 2005, Variety awarded Tom Rothman and Jim Gianopulos the Showman of the Year Award.
In 2007, Entertainment Weekly ranked Tom Rothman #19 on their list of "The 50 Smartest People in Hollywood.
In 2009, Mentor L.A. honored Tom Rothman for his commitment to public education.
In 2011, The Gotham Independent Film Awards awarded Rothman the Industry Tribute, which is the lifetime achievement award for independent film.
In the fall of 2012, MSN Entertainment listed the fact that Tom Rothman left 20th Century Fox as one of the "Biggest Movie Bummers of 2012".
In 2012, The American Jewish Committee awarded Tom Rothman the Dorothy & Sherrill Corwin Award for Human Relations.
In 2017, Tom Rothman was honored with the Producers Guild of America Milestone Award.
In 2019, Academy of Motion Picture Arts and Sciences awarded Sony Pictures Entertainment with an Oscar Award under Rothman's leadership, for Spider-Man: Into the Spider-Verse.
In 2020, under Rothman's chairmanship, Sony Pictures Entertainment received 20 Oscar nominations, including two Best Picture nominations for Once Upon a Time in Hollywood and Little Women.
Rothman accepted that Oscar on behalf of British producer Christian Colson, who could not attend the 81st Academy Awards ceremony.

Philanthropy

Rothman is active in the nonprofit arts and education arenas. In December 2013, President Obama nominated Rothman to serve on the 18-member National Council on the Arts. The Council advises on the National Endowment for the Arts's policies and programs and makes recommendations on grant applications. He is a member of the Board of the Corporation of Brown University, where he serves on the Academic Affairs Committee. He has worked as a teacher and fundraiser for Mentor L.A. Partner Schools. Rothman is an emeritus member of the board of directors of the Sundance Institute, which he served for 20 years, and
the American Film Institute, a top film graduate school. Tom Rothman has been involved in fundraising activities for The Jewish Home for the Aging, the National Multiple Sclerosis Society, and the American Jewish Committee. He serves on the board of New York's Art Therapy Outreach Center (ATOC), an organization that uses art therapy to help at risk groups. He serves on the board of trustees for California Institute of the Arts.

Politics 
In July 2022, Rothman contributed $25,000 to The Next 50, a liberal political action committee (PAC).

Personal life

Rothman is married to actress, singer, and author Jessica Harper. The couple have two daughters. Rothman is the brother of actor John Rothman. In 2012, he was appointed as a director of Priceline.com Inc.

References

External links

1954 births
20th-century American businesspeople
21st-century American businesspeople
American film studio executives
20th Century Studios people
Sony Pictures Entertainment people
Brown University alumni
Columbia Law School alumni
20th-century American Jews
Living people
Businesspeople from Baltimore
American lawyers
Park School of Baltimore alumni
21st-century American Jews
Presidents of Columbia Pictures